Olympics 40 is a 1980 Polish drama film directed by Andrzej Kotkowski. The film was selected as the Polish entry for the Best Foreign Language Film at the 53rd Academy Awards, but was not accepted as a nominee.

Plot
The film is based on actual events from World War II. During August 1940, prisoners of war celebrated a "special Olympics" called the International Prisoner-of-War Olympic Games at Stalag XIII-A in Langwasser, near Nuremberg, Germany. An Olympic flag, 29 by 46 cm in size, was made of a Polish prisoner's shirt and, drawn in crayon, it featured the Olympic rings and banners for Belgium, France, Great Britain, Norway, Poland, and the Netherlands. Olympics 40 tells the story of these games and of one of the prisoners of war, Teodor Niewiadomski.

Cast
 Mariusz Benoit as Piotr
 Jerzy Bończak as Jacques
 Tadeusz Galia as Leon
 Krzysztof Janczar as Andrzej
 Ryszard Kotys as Schlappke
 Wojciech Pszoniak as Schulz

See also
 1940 Summer Olympics
 List of submissions to the 53rd Academy Awards for Best Foreign Language Film
 List of Polish submissions for the Academy Award for Best Foreign Language Film

References

External links
 

1980 films
1980 drama films
Polish sports drama films
1980s Polish-language films
World War II films based on actual events
Films set in 1940
Sports films based on actual events
1980s sports drama films
1940 Summer Olympics